WVA, also known as KV A, is a small single room tomb, located in the Western Valley of the Kings, and is associated with the nearby tomb of Amenhotep III, WV22. The tomb was re-excavated in the 1990s by a team from Waseda University led by Sakuji Yoshimura and Jiro Kondo. They found the tomb contained assorted jars and sealings, indicating the tomb was likely used as storage for overflow from the nearby tomb of Amenhotep III.

Discovery, location, and excavation
It was discovered by Karl Richard Lepsius in 1845.

Re-excavation
The tomb was re-excavated in the 1990s by a team from Waseda University led by Sakuji Yoshimura and Jiro Kondo. The doorway preserves most of its original stone blocking, one of the only tombs in the valley to do so. The objects recovered consisted mostly of pottery sherds, consistent with earlier reports of the contents; the sherds most commonly represent wine jars and blue painted pottery. Also found were wine jar stands, jar sealings, and jar dockets dating to years 32 and 37 of Amenhotep III's reign. However, no items were found to indicate that the tomb itself ever contained a burial. The presence of ostraca, some of which were used as paint palettes, and items such as a length of rope, indicate that the tomb was likely used by craftsmen during the cutting and decorating of the nearby royal tomb and then later utilized to store overflow from the tomb itself. However, Kondo cautions that "the precise nature and contents of WVA should be assessed with caution" due to the mixed nature of finds in the area immediately surrounding the tomb.

References

External links
 Theban Mapping Project:KV A - Includes detailed maps of most of the tombs.

Buildings and structures completed in the 14th century BC
WVA